The 1929–30 İstanbul Football League season was the 22nd season of the league. Fenerbahçe SK won the league for the 5th time.

Season

References
 Erdoğan Arıpınar; Tevfik Ünsi Artun, Cem Atabeyoğlu, Nurhan Aydın, Ergun Hiçyılmaz, Haluk San, Orhan Vedat Sevinçli, Vala Somalı (June 1992). Türk Futbol Tarihi (1904-1991) vol.1, Page(47), Türkiye Futbol Federasyonu Yayınları.

Istanbul Football League seasons
Turkey
Istanbul